Gosan-ri is an administrative division, or village, located in Onyang, Ulju County, Ulsan, South Korea.

See also
South Korea portal

References

External links 
 Onyang district official web site 

Ulju County
Villages in South Korea